Jan Reijnen (3 February 1927 in Kaatsheuvel – 7 April 2020 in Vught) was a Dutch politician of the Catholic People's Party and later the Christian Democratic Appeal. He was mayor of Wervershoof (1964–1969), Oldenzaal (1969–1976) and Heerlen (1976–1986). He was a member of the Senate from 16 May 1972 until 20 September 1977.

References

1927 births
2020 deaths
Catholic People's Party politicians
Christian Democratic Appeal politicians
Mayors of Heerlen
Mayors in North Holland
Members of the Senate (Netherlands)
People from Loon op Zand
Mayors in Overijssel